The BL 4-inch Mark VIII naval gun was a British medium-velocity wire-wound naval gun introduced in 1908 as an anti-torpedo boat gun in smaller ships whose decks could not support the strain of the heavier and more powerful Mk VII gun.

Mk VIII history 

The gun succeeded the QF 4-inch Mk III, whose  shell had been considered insufficiently powerful for its intended role. The BL Mk VIII fired a  shell. It armed the following warships :
  laid down 1905
  of 1909
 s of 1910
 s of 1910
 s (Australia) of 1910.

The gun was succeeded in its class from 1911 by the QF 4-inch Mk IV.

In World War II many guns were used to arm merchant ships.

Mk XI submarine gun 

A Mark XI-variant was adapted to arm the K-class submarines laid down 1915.

See also 
 List of naval guns
 German 10.5 cm SK L/40 naval gun – firing slightly heavier shell

Notes

References

Sources 
 HANDBOOK for the 4" Mark VII. and VIII. B.L. Guns 1913 (Corrected to September 1913.) ADMIRALTY Gunnery Branch, G.8652/13

External links 

 Tony DiGiulian, British 4"/40 (10.2 cm) BL Mark VIII and Mark XI

Naval guns of the United Kingdom
World War I naval weapons of the United Kingdom
100 mm artillery